Lightly and Politely is a 1960 album by the American jazz singer Betty Roché. This was the last album Roché recorded.

Reception
Scott Yanow reviewed the album for AllMusic and wrote: "It is ironic that what is arguably singer Betty Roché's finest all-around recording was also her last". Yanow wrote that "Roché improvises constantly and uplifts a variety of superior standards...It's recommended, particularly to jazz fans not aware of Betty Roché's musical talents".

Track listing
 "Someone to Watch Over Me" (George Gershwin, Ira Gershwin) – 4:46
 "Why Shouldn't I?" (Cole Porter) – 3:28
 "Jim" (Caesar Petrillo, Edward Ross, Nelson Shawn) – 4:33
 "Polka Dots and Moonbeams" (Johnny Burke, Jimmy Van Heusen) – 3:52
 "For All We Know" (J. Fred Coots, Sam M. Lewis) – 2:41
 "Rocks in My Bed" (Duke Ellington) – 4:11
 "Just Squeeze Me (But Please Don't Tease Me)" (Ellington, Lee Gaines, Fats Waller, Clarence Williams) – 2:40
 "I Got It Bad (and That Ain't Good)" (Ellington, Paul Francis Webster) – 3:42
 "Maybe You'll Be There" (Rube Bloom, Sammy Gallop) – 3:37
 "I Had the Craziest Dream" (Mack Gordon, Harry Warren) – 2:12

Personnel
Betty Roché – vocals
Jimmy Neely – piano
Wally Richardson – guitar
Michel Mulia – double bass
Rudy Lawless – drums
Rudy Van Gelder – engineer
Joe Goldberg – liner notes
Phil DeLancie – digital remastering

References

1961 albums
Albums recorded at Van Gelder Studio
Betty Roché albums
Prestige Records albums